{{Infobox television
| image                = El derecho de nacer 2001 poster.jpg
| num_episodes         = 80
| genre                = TelenovelaRomanceDrama
| creator              = Félix B. Caignet
| writer               = Fernanda VilleliMarcela Fuentes BerainValentina Sánchez Villenave
| starring             = Kate del CastilloSaúl LisazoDiana BrachoCarlos Bracho
| opentheme            = Quisiera by Alejandro FernándezTantita pena (olnly in United States) by Alejandro Fernández
| endtheme             =
| theme_music_composer = 
| language             = Spanish
| country              = Mexico
| runtime              = 41-44 minutes
| company              = Televisa
| distributor          = Televisa
| location             = FilmingTelevisa San Ángel Mexico City, Mexico
| channel              = Canal de las Estrellas
| audio_format         = 
| picture_format       = NTSC
| first_aired          = 
| last_aired           = 
| executive_producer   = Carlos Sotomayor
| producer             = Rafael Urióstegui
| director             = Sergio Cataño
| cinematography       = Carlos Sánchez Zúñiga
| camera               = Multi-camera
| editor               = 
| preceded_by          = Abrázame muy fuerte
| followed_by          = Sin pecado concebido
| related              = El derecho de nacer (1981-1982) 
}}El derecho de nacer is a Mexican telenovela produced by Carlos Sotomayor for Televisa. It aired on Canal de las Estrellas from February 5, 2001 to May 25, 2001. It is a remake of the popular 1981 telenovela of the same name.

The series stars Kate del Castillo, Saúl Lisazo, Diana Bracho and Carlos Bracho.

 Plot El derecho de nacer'' tells the story of the del Junco family: Rafael (Carlos Bracho), a powerful man, a despot, and a male chauvinist; his wife Clemencia (Diana Bracho), who flees her reality with drugs; and their daughters María Elena (Kate del Castillo) and Matilde (Maite Embil), victims of their father's oppression.

Their father is, to the public, a pillar of society, but in secret gives free rein to his base instincts. María Elena is seduced by Alfredo Martínez (Hugo Acosta), a compulsive gambler who flees the city in order to escape his debts, leaving the minor pregnant.  Upon finding out, Don Rafael tries to abort his daughter's child, but it's too late, so he sends her to his farm so that the baby will be born there.

Given María Elena's refusal to give the child up for adoption, her father orders his foreman to kill the newborn.  María Dolores (Francis Laboriel), María Elena's faithful nanny, saves the little one and flees with him to Mexico City.

Don Rafael believes that the child has died, while María Elena dedicates her body and soul to searching for her little son with the help of Aldo Drigani (Saúl Lisazo), whom she later marries after he saves her from various conflicts. With many sacrifices, but with a mother's great love, María Dolores rears little Alberto (Miguel Ángel Biaggio) and educates him so that he will be a good man.

Thus, he becomes a brilliant physician who goes to Mérida, where he faces a past that he never suspected and a future he never pursued.

Cast
Kate del Castillo as María Elena del Junco Rivera
Saúl Lisazo as Aldo Drigani
Diana Bracho as Clemencia Rivera de del Junco
Carlos Bracho as Rafael del Junco
Maite Embil as Matilde del Junco Rivera de Armenteros
Sabine Moussier as Graciela
Gabriela Goldsmith as Adriana Drigani de Rivera
Hugo Acosta as Alfredo Martínez
Jorge Antolín as Jorge Luis Armenteros
Sergio Corona as Manuel Puk
David Ostrosky as José Rivera
Francis Laboriel as María Dolores Limonta "Mamá Dolores"
Irán Castillo as Isabel Cristina Armenteros del Junco
Miguel Ángel Biaggio as Dr. Alberto Limonta
Raúl Araiza as El Negro
Verónica Jaspeado as Teté Puk de de la Reguera
Ingrid Martz as Leonor Castro
Mauricio Bonet as Eduardo
Juan Ríos Cantu as Raúl
Ehécatl Chávez as Bruno
Zaide Silvia Gutiérrez as La Loba
Paulina de Labra as Rosa
Tony Bravo as Dr. Alejandro Sierra
Audrey Vera as Angélica de la Reguera
Jorge Consejo as Osvaldo Martínez
Ricardo Schmall as Santiago
Sergio Cataño as Carlos
Daniel Rendón as Héctor
Jorge Capin as Joe
Linda Elizabeth as Jacinta
Héctor Sánchez as El Mudo
Adalberto Parra
Karla Graham

Awards and nominations

References

External links
 at esmas.com 

2001 telenovelas
Mexican telenovelas
2001 Mexican television series debuts
2001 Mexican television series endings
Spanish-language telenovelas
Television shows set in Mexico
Televisa telenovelas